The 2006 FIFA World Cup final was a football match that took place on 9 July 2006 at the Olympiastadion in Berlin, Germany, to determine the winner of the 2006 FIFA World Cup. The match was contested between Italy and France.

Italy won the World Cup after beating France 5–3 in a penalty shoot-out following a 1–1 draw at the conclusion of extra time. The match was focused mostly on France's Zinedine Zidane and Italy's Marco Materazzi: this was the former's last match for France, they each scored their team's only goal of the game, and they were also involved in an incident in extra time that led to Zidane being sent off for headbutting Materazzi in the chest. The incident was the subject of much analysis following the match. Italy's Andrea Pirlo was named the man of the match, and Zidane was awarded the Golden Ball as the best player of the tournament.

The final served as a key match in the France–Italy football rivalry, coming after Italy were defeated by France in the UEFA Euro 2000 Final. Italy's victory was their first world title in 24 years, and their fourth overall, putting them one ahead of Germany and only one behind Brazil. The victory also led to Italy topping the FIFA World Rankings in February 2007 for the first time since November 1993.

Venue
The Olympiastadion in Berlin was used as the venue for the final, as well as five other matches over the tournament. It was also used for three matches at the 1974 FIFA World Cup. The current Olympiastadion was built for the 1936 Summer Olympics in the western part of the city. Since 1985, the stadium has hosted the finals of both the DFB-Pokal and its female equivalent. The Olympiastadion hosts the Internationales Stadionfest, which was an IAAF Golden League event from 1998 to 2009. The stadium hosted the 2009 World Championships in Athletics. Aside from its use as an Olympic stadium, the Olympiastadion has a strong footballing tradition, having been the home of Hertha BSC since 1963.

Background

Italy's first official match as a national team was against France on 15 May 1910, and the two countries developed a football rivalry. They have faced each other in several world-stage tournaments, including previous World Cups in 1938 (3–1 Italy), 1978 (2–1 Italy), 1986 (2–0 France), and 1998 (4–3 in penalty-shootout to France). Most recently, they had contested the UEFA Euro 2000 Final, which ended in a 2–1 victory for France after a golden goal in extra time by David Trezeguet.

The match was the sixth FIFA World Cup final for Italy, and the second for France. Italy had won three of their previous finals (1934, 1938, 1982), losing two (1970, 1994), while France had won their only previous final (1998). It was the first final since 1978 in which neither Germany nor Brazil competed (and only the second since 1938); it was also the first all-European final since Italy won the World Cup in 1982, and the second final to be decided by a penalty shoot-out (1994 was the first, with Italy losing to Brazil on that occasion).

In April 2006, France's Zinedine Zidane, who also played for Spanish league side Real Madrid, announced his retirement from football, saying his playing career would end after the World Cup. In May 2006, a match-fixing scandal in Italy's Serie A league was uncovered, mainly surrounding Juventus, a team to which five of the national squad players belonged.

Road to the final

Italy
Italy's campaign in the tournament was accompanied by open pessimism, in large part due to the controversy caused by the Serie A scandal. Italy were drawn in Group E alongside Ghana, the United States, and Czech Republic, opening against Ghana on 12 June 2006. Italy took the lead through midfielder Andrea Pirlo in the 40th minute, eventually winning the match by a score of 2–0. In their next match against the United States on 17 June, Italy took the lead in the 22nd minute with an Alberto Gilardino goal, but five minutes later, Cristian Zaccardo scored an own goal off an attempted clearance following a free-kick, and the match eventually remained a 1–1 draw; this was one of only two goals Italy conceded throughout the tournament. In that match, Daniele De Rossi received a straight red card after he elbowed Brian McBride in the face; he left the pitch bloodied, but returned after treatment, later receiving three stitches. De Rossi later apologised to McBride, who subsequently praised him as "classy" for approaching him after the match. Because of the incident, De Rossi was banned for four matches, and was fined CHF 10,000. Their third and final group stage match was against Czech Republic on 22 June. Marco Materazzi, who had begun the tournament as a reserve player, came on as a replacement for Alessandro Nesta who suffered an injury in the match. Materazzi went on to score a goal in the match, and was named Man of the Match of an eventual 2–0 win, finishing top of the group with seven points.

In the round of 16, on 26 June, Italy took on Australia in a match in which Materazzi was controversially sent off in the 53rd minute after an attempted two-footed tackle on Australian midfielder Marco Bresciano. In stoppage time, a controversial penalty kick was awarded to Italy when referee Luis Medina Cantalejo ruled that Lucas Neill fouled Fabio Grosso. Francesco Totti converted the kick into the upper corner of the goal past Mark Schwarzer for a 1–0 win. In the quarter-final, on 30 June, Italy took on Ukraine, and Gianluca Zambrotta opened the scoring early in the 6th minute with a left-footed shot from outside the penalty area after a quick exchange with Totti created enough space. Luca Toni added two more goals for Italy in the second half, but as Ukraine pressed forward, they were unable to score. Ukraine had hit the crossbar, had several shots saved by Italy goalkeeper Gianluigi Buffon, and were denied a goal from a goal-line clearance from Zambrotta, ultimately ending in a 3–0 win for Italy. In the semi-final on 4 July, Italy beat hosts Germany 2–0 with the two goals coming in the last two minutes of extra time. After a back-and-forth half-hour of extra time, during which Gilardino and Zambrotta struck the post and the crossbar respectively, Grosso scored in the 119th minute after a disguised Pirlo pass found him open in the penalty area for a bending left-footed shot into the far corner past German goalkeeper Jens Lehmann's dive. Substitute striker Alessandro Del Piero then sealed the victory by scoring with the last kick of the game at the end of a swift counterattack by Fabio Cannavaro, Totti and Gilardino.

France
France were drawn in Group G alongside Switzerland, South Korea, and Togo, opening against Switzerland on 13 June 2006. The match ended in a scoreless draw. In their next match against South Korea on 18 June, France took the lead in the 9th minute after Thierry Henry picked up Sylvain Wiltord's deflected shot. Later, a header by Patrick Vieira crossed the goal-line after being blocked by Korean goalkeeper Lee Woon-Jae, but referee Benito Archundia did not give the goal as he had deemed Vieira to have committed a foul. With about 10 minutes left, Park Ji-sung scored for Korea to claim an eventual 1–1 draw. Their third and final group stage match was against Togo on 23 June, and France needed a victory to progress from the group stage. After a goalless first half, Vieira and Henry scored two second half goals within six minutes of each other to win 2–0, and finish second in the group with five points.

In the round of 16, on 27 June, France took on Spain in a match in which Spain took the lead in the first half with a penalty kick converted by David Villa after Lilian Thuram fouled Pablo. Four minutes before half time, Franck Ribéry equalised the score, and with seven minutes before the end of regulation time, Vieira scored from a header for France to take the lead. As Spain pushed forward to find an equaliser, Zinedine Zidane scored in a solo effort in stoppage time, for a final score of 3–1 for France. In the quarter-final, on 1 July, France took on Brazil; France won with a lone goal in the 57th minute by Henry after he volleyed a Zidane free kick to end Brazil's reign as world champions. In the semi-final, on 5 July, France won again with a lone goal, this time from a first half Zidane penalty kick after Henry was tripped inside the box by Ricardo Carvalho.

Pre-match
The official match ball for the final was the + Teamgeist Berlin, a gold-coloured variation of the Adidas Teamgeist, which was unveiled on 18 April 2006. The Adidas Teamgeist was used as the official match ball throughout the tournament, provided by German sports equipment company Adidas.

On 6 July 2006, the Argentine Horacio Elizondo was chosen as referee for the final, beating out the German Markus Merk and the Slovakian Ľuboš Micheľ. Elizondo became a referee in 1994, and refereed his first international match in 1996. His compatriots, Dario García and Rodolfo Otero, were chosen as assistant referees, and the Spanish Luis Medina Cantalejo as fourth official. Elizondo had given England striker Wayne Rooney a red card against Portugal previously in the tournament.

Italy's team doctor Enrico Castellacci confirmed on 6 July that Alessandro Nesta was ruled out of the final due to a groin injury he sustained against the Czech Republic on 22 June; France reported no injuries.

Before the match started, a closing ceremony was organised by FIFA, lasting about 10 minutes, was performed by Il Divo singing their song "The Time of Our Lives", the official song of the 2006 FIFA World Cup, as well as Shakira and Wyclef Jean singing a rendition of their song "Hips Don't Lie".

Match

Summary

The final started with each side scoring within the first 20 minutes, making it the only World Cup final from 1990 to 2014 in which both finalists scored. Referee Elizondo awarded an penalty kick when he deemed Florent Malouda to have been fouled by Marco Materazzi. Zinedine Zidane opened the scoring when he converted this kick in the 7th minute with a Panenka that glanced off the underside of the crossbar and into the goal. Materazzi redeemed himself for Italy when he levelled the score in the 19th minute, a header from an Andrea Pirlo corner. In the 35th minute, Luca Toni struck the crossbar with a header from another Pirlo corner. At half time, the score was level at 1–1.

The beginning of the second half was largely controlled by France, also having a penalty shout early on when Malouda was brought to ground in the box by Gianluca Zambrotta. Patrick Vieira was replaced by Alou Diarra in the 58th minute due to an apparent hamstring injury. In the 62nd minute, Toni headed a goal that was disallowed for offside from a Pirlo free kick. After the 90 minutes of regulation time, the score was still level at 1–1, forcing the match into extra time.

In the 104th minute, Italian goalkeeper Gianluigi Buffon made a potentially game-saving save when he tipped a Zidane header over the crossbar that had been crossed in from Willy Sagnol. Five minutes later, Zidane and Materazzi were jogging up the pitch alongside each other. They briefly exchanged words and Materazzi pulled at Zidane's jersey; this provoked Zidane to headbutt Materazzi's chest, knocking him to the ground. As the game play had switched direction, Buffon protested to the assistant referee who did not see what had happened. When the play returned and referee Elizondo saw Materazzi on the ground, he halted play to consult his assistants. According to match officials' reports, the referee and his assistants did not see what had transpired, however, Elizondo consulted fourth official Luis Medina Cantalejo via headset, who confirmed the incident. Elizondo then issued Zidane a red card in the 110th minute. It marked the 14th overall expulsion of Zidane's career, and meant he joined Cameroon's Rigobert Song as the only players ever to be sent off during two separate World Cup tournaments. He also became the fourth player red-carded in a World Cup final, in addition to being the first sent off in extra time.

After extra time, the score was still level at 1–1, forcing the match into a penalty shoot-out. France's David Trezeguet, who had scored the golden goal against Italy in the UEFA Euro 2000 Final, was the only player not to score his penalty after his kick hit the crossbar, shot down after its impact, and stayed just ahead of the goal-line. Fabio Grosso—who scored Italy's first goal in the semi-final against Germany—scored the winning penalty; Italy won by a score of 5–3.

Details

Statistics

Viewership
According to FIFA, 715.1 million individuals globally watched the final match of this tournament. IPG's independent media agency Initiative Worldwide estimated a 260 million people viewership. The independent firm Initiative Futures Sport + Entertainment estimates it at 322 million viewers.

Post-match
German president Horst Köhler, UEFA president Lennart Johansson, and the local organizing committee president Franz Beckenbauer were among those present on the pitch stage during the awards ceremony. President Köhler handed the trophy to Italian captain Fabio Cannavaro without FIFA president Sepp Blatter's presence. As Cannavaro raised the trophy, a short version of Patrizio Buanne's "Stand Up (Champions Theme)" was played. The victory also led to Italy topping the FIFA World Rankings in February 2007 for the first time since November 1993. Pirlo was awarded the Man of the Match. The day after the final, Zidane was awarded the Golden Ball as the player of the tournament. The Italy team celebrated their victory with a parade in Rome the day after the final on 10 July, attended by 500,000 people, the team traveled to the Circus Maximus. The team also met with President of Italy Giorgio Napolitano and Prime Minister of Italy Romano Prodi, where all members of the World Cup-winning squad were awarded the Italian Order of Merit of Cavaliere Ufficiale.

Provocation of Zidane analysis

After video evidence suggested that Materazzi had verbally provoked Zidane into the headbutt, three British media newspapers claimed to have hired lip readers to determine what Materazzi had said, with The Times, The Sun and Daily Star claiming that Materazzi called Zidane "the son of a terrorist whore". Materazzi disputed this claim, eventually winning public apologies from The Sun and Daily Star in 2008, as well as libel damages from all three British newspapers.

Zidane only partly explained that repeated harsh insults about his mother had caused him to react. Materazzi admitted trash talking Zidane, but argued that Zidane's behaviour had been very arrogant and that the remarks were trivial. Materazzi also insisted that he did not insult Zidane's mother (who was ill at the time), claiming, "I didn't talk about his mother, either. I lost my mother when I was fifteen, and even now I still get emotional talking about it".

Zidane later said that he did not regret his actions because "it would be like admitting that he was right to say all that". Materazzi offered his version of events two months later claiming that after he had grabbed Zidane's jersey, Zidane remarked, "If you want my shirt, I will give it to you afterwards", and he replied to Zidane that he would prefer his sister, but claimed during the interview that he was unaware Zidane even had a sister. Over a year after the incident, Materazzi confirmed that his precise words to Zidane were: "I prefer the whore that is your sister".

Reactions
After the final, then-President of France Jacques Chirac hailed Zidane as a "man of heart and conviction". Chirac later added that he found the offence to be unacceptable, but he understood that Zidane had been provoked. The French public showed support for Zidane's actions; polls done in the immediate wake of the incident showed 61% of French people said they had already forgiven him for his actions while 52% said they understood them. However, French newspaper Le Figaro called the headbutt "odious" and "unacceptable". Time magazine regarded the incident as a symbol for Europe's "grappling with multi-culturalism". Despite the ongoing furore, Zidane's sponsors announced that they would stick with him.

The incident was extensively lampooned on the Internet and in popular culture. Family Guy parodied it in the episode "Saving Private Brian", in which Zidane headbutts an old lady while delivering her a birthday cake. The Simpsons parodied it in the episode "Marge Gamer", in which Homer Simpson shouts "Zidane!", when headbutting the linesman. In addition to becoming a staple of parody via numerous online videos and GIFs, a novelty song titled Coup de Boule ("Headbutt") reached the top of the French charts. A sculpture of the incident was unveiled in 2012.

In light of Zidane's statements, FIFA opened disciplinary proceedings to investigate the incident. FIFA also affirmed the legality of Elizondo's decision to send Zidane off, rejecting claims that Cantalejo had illegally relied on video transmission to make a decision about handling Zidane's misconduct. FIFA issued a CHF 5,000 fine and a two-match ban against Materazzi, while Zidane received a three-match ban and a CHF 7,500 fine. Since Zidane had already retired, he voluntarily served three days of community service on FIFA's behalf as a substitute for the match ban.

In October 2009, in an interview conducted on French radio station RTL, Zidane stated: "Let's not forget that provocation is a terrible thing. I have never been one to provoke; I have never done it. It's terrible, and it is best not to react". However, he later said in 2015, "If you look at the 14 red cards I had in my career, 12 of them were a result of provocation. This isn't justification, this isn't an excuse, but my passion, temper and blood made me react." In 2010, Zidane had said that he would "rather die than apologise" to Materazzi for the headbutt in the final, but also admitted that he "could never have lived with himself" had he been allowed to remain on the pitch and help France win the match.

References

External links
 Italy v France | 2006 FIFA World Cup Final | Full Match

Final
FIFA World Cup finals
France national football team matches
Italy national football team matches
Fifa World Cup Final 2006
Fifa World Cup Final 2006
 
2006 in Berlin
 
FIFA World Cup 2006
July 2006 sports events in Europe
Association football matches in Germany
Internet memes introduced in 2006